Wilhelmina Marie Wright (born January 13, 1964) is a United States district judge of the United States District Court for the District of Minnesota. She is the only jurist in Minnesota's history to be State District Court Judge, Appellate Court Judge and state Supreme Court justice. She was formerly an associate justice of the Minnesota Supreme Court, a judge of the Minnesota Court of Appeals, and a Judge of the Minnesota District Court, Second Judicial District (Ramsey County).

Early life and education 
Wright was born on January 13, 1964, in Norfolk, Virginia. Growing up, her mother had to advocate for her to receive equal education due to ongoing resistance to integration. She went on to study literature at Yale University, receiving a Bachelor of Arts degree and graduating cum laude in 1986. Wright received her Juris Doctor from Harvard Law School in 1989.

Career

Early legal career 
Wright served as a law clerk for Judge Damon Keith of the United States Court of Appeals for the Sixth Circuit from 1989 to 1991. In 1991, she began working at the law firm of Hogan & Hartson, LLP, in Washington, D.C., where Wright took up cases involving U.S. public schools' opportunity, before joining the United States Attorney's Office in Minnesota in 1995. In this position, Wright was an Assistant Attorney for the U.S. District Court and the U.S. Eighth Circuit Court of Appeals, where she took up cases involving illegal economic activity and violence. Between 2000 and 2002, Wright was involved with the Minnesota State Bar Association Task Force on the American Bar Association Model Rules of Professional Conduct, the Minnesota Judicial Council, and the Minnesota Courts Public Trust and Confidence Work Group, as a judge for the Ramsey County District Court.

Teaching 
Wright has also taught others about the law. In Geneva, Switzerland, she worked for International Bridges to Justice training on the rule of law, and in Belgium and other areas in Switzerland she taught judicial selection. Closer to home, she was a professor at the University of St. Thomas School of Law and taught judicial accountability in other areas of the United States.

State judicial service 

Minnesota Governor Jesse Ventura appointed her to the Ramsey County District Court in 2000 and in 2002 he appointed her to the Minnesota Court of Appeals, on which she served from September 3, 2002, to September 26, 2012. As part of this position, Wright was the Special Redistricting Panel Presiding Judge between June 2011 and August 2012.

Governor Mark Dayton appointed Wright to the Minnesota Supreme Court on August 20, 2012. As the first African American woman to serve on the Minnesota Supreme Court, stakes were high. In an August 2012 interview with Minnesota Lawyer Managing Editor Barbara Jones, Wright stated she had the opportunity to help the court "reflect the diversity of Minnesota." Her term began on September 27, 2012. Her term ended in 2016. In 2014, Wright was re-elected and served part of her term that was set to end in 2020, but she moved to serve federally.

Federal judicial service 

In February 2015, Amy Klobuchar and Al Franken recommended Wright to be on the federal bench. On April 15, 2015, President Barack Obama nominated Wright to serve as a United States District Judge of the United States District Court for the District of Minnesota, stating he was "confident she will serve on the federal bench with distinction." She was appointed to the seat vacated by Judge Michael J. Davis, Minnesota's first Black federal judge, who assumed senior status effective on August 1, 2015. Wright was ranked Unanimously Well Qualified for this federal position by the American Bar Association. After a hearing on July 22, 2015, her nomination was reported by the Senate Judiciary Committee on September 17, 2015, by a voice vote. This made Wright the first African American woman appointed to the United States District Court for the District of Minnesota. On January 19, 2016, the Senate confirmed her nomination by a 58–36 vote, and the vote included 14 Republicans. During the confirmation, Amy Klobuchar called the seat vacancy a "judicial emergency." She took the oath of office for federal court on February 18, 2016. Wright continues to serve as U.S. District Judge. In January 2022, following Justice Stephen Breyer's announcement of his intention to retire, Wright was mentioned as one of the potential nominees for a Supreme Court appointment by President Joe Biden.

Awards 
Wright has earned numerous awards during her career, including the Myra Bradwell Award in 2006 from the Minnesota Women Lawyers, the Lena O. Smith Achievement Award from the Black Women Lawyers Network in 2004, the B. Warren Hart Award for Public Service from the Saint Paul Jaycees in 2001, and the Ten Outstanding Young Minnesotans Award in 2000. In 1997, Justice Wright also earned the United States Department of Justice Special Achievement Award and in 2000, she earned the United States Department of Justice Director's Award for Public Service. In 2008, she joined the American Law Institute, and in 2019 she was given a Diversity and Inclusion Award from Minnesota Lawyer.

Personal life
Wright is married to Ecolab executive Dan Schmechel. They have one daughter. Wright serves on the American Bar Association, the Minnesota State Bar Association, the Ramsey County Bar Association, the Minnesota Association of Black Lawyers, and the National Association of Women Judges. Wright is also a member of, among others, the William Mitchell College of Law Board of Trustees, the Hubert H. Humphrey Institute of Public Affairs Advisory Council, the Minnesota Lawyer Advisory Board, and the Yale University Council.

See also 
 Joe Biden Supreme Court candidates
 List of African-American federal judges
 List of African-American jurists

References

External links

|-

1964 births
21st-century American judges
21st-century American women judges
Living people
African-American judges
Assistant United States Attorneys
Harvard Law School alumni
Judges of the United States District Court for the District of Minnesota
Justices of the Minnesota Supreme Court
Lawyers from Washington, D.C.
Minnesota Court of Appeals judges
Politicians from Norfolk, Virginia
United States district court judges appointed by Barack Obama
Yale College alumni